Malotina (also North Malo Killi Killi, Ile Malo Killi Killi du Nord, Île Malotina) is a small uninhabited island in Sanma Province of Vanuatu in the Pacific Ocean.

Geography
Malotina lies off the eastern coast of Malo Island.

References

Islands of Vanuatu
Sanma Province
Uninhabited islands of Vanuatu